The Gold Dagger is an award given annually by the Crime Writers' Association of the United Kingdom since 1960 for the best crime novel of the year.

From 1955 to 1959, the organization named their top honor as the Crossed Red Herring Award. From 1995 to 2002 the award acquired sponsorship from Macallan and was known as the Macallan Gold Dagger.

In 2006, because of new sponsorship from the Duncan Lawrie Bank, the award was officially renamed as the Duncan Lawrie Dagger, and gained a prize fund of £20,000.  It was the biggest crime-fiction award in the world in monetary terms.  In 2008, Duncan Lawrie Bank withdrew its sponsorship of the awards. As a result, the top prize is again called the Gold Dagger without a monetary award.

From 1969 to 2005, a Silver Dagger was awarded to the runner-up.  When Duncan Lawrie acquired sponsorship, this award was dropped. After the sponsorship was withdrawn, this award was not reinstated.

Since its inception, the award has been given to 57 writers. Ruth Rendell has won the award a record four times, including two awards for the novels A Fatal Inversion and King Solomon's Carpet, published under the pseudonym Barbara Vine; this makes her the only writer who has won the award under different names. Rendell, James Lee Burke, and Mick Herron were nominated a record five times. Abir Mukherjee is the most nominated author in this category without a single win (4 nominations).

The Crime Writers' Association also awards the CWA Gold Dagger for Non-Fiction and several other "Dagger" awards.

Winners
Winners and, where known, shortlisted titles for each year:

1950s

1960s

1970s

1980s

1990s

2000s

2010s

2020s

Multiple awards and nominations

Gold Dagger

The following individuals received two or more Gold Dagger awards:

The following individuals received two or more Gold Dagger nominations:

Silver Dagger

The following individuals received two or more Silver Dagger awards:

Gold and Silver Daggers wins
The following individuals received both Gold and Silver Dagger awards:
 Colin Dexter
 James H. McClure
 Sara Paretsky
 Anthony Price
 Peter Lovesey
 Ruth Rendell

Records
 Ngaio Marsh was the first writer to receive more than one nomination.
 Ross Macdonald was the first writer to receive two consecutive nominations
 Peter Dickinson is the first writer to receive two Gold Daggers. He and Ruth Rendell are the only ones to win in this category two years in a row.
 Joan Fleming is the first female to win two awards.
 Anthony Price is the first writer to win both the Gold and Silver Daggers.
 P.D. James and Peter Lovesey win a record three Silver Daggers. James also won the most Silver Daggers as the author who never won a Gold Dagger.
 Colin Dexter is the only writer to win both two Silver and two Gold Daggers.
 Ruth Rendell has won the Gold Dagger a record four times. She is also the only one to win the award under different names.
 Ruth Rendell, James Lee Burke and Mick Herron have the most nominations (5).
 Mick Herron has the most consecutive nominations (3).
 Abir Mukherjee has the most nominations without a win (4).

References

External links
The Gold Dagger at Crime Writers' Association official webpage

Crime Writers' Association awards
1955 establishments in the United Kingdom
Awards established in 1955
Mystery and detective fiction awards